Laro, also Laru, Aaleira, Ngwullaro, Yillaro, is a Niger–Congo language in the Heiban family spoken in the Nuba Mountains in Kordofan, Sudan.

Villages are Oya, Rodong (Hajar Medani), Hajar Baco, Gunisaia, Serif, Tondly, Reli, Lagau (Serfinila), Getaw (Hajar Tiya), and Orme (Ando) (Ethnologue, 22nd edition).

References

External links
 Laru (Laro) basic lexicon at the Global Lexicostatistical Database

Definitely endangered languages
Languages of Sudan
Heiban languages